Jacek Frąckiewicz (born 19 September 1969) is a former Polish footballer.

Frąckiewicz, born in Sztum, played 11 games and scored two goals in the 1987–88 Ekstraklasa with Lechia Gdańsk in his native Poland before moving to Germany, aged 19, where he spent the rest of his career. In total, he amassed 17 goals in 83 2. Bundesliga appearances for Eintracht Braunschweig and VfL Wolfsburg and 21 goals in 63 Regionalliga Nordost games for 1. FC Union Berlin and Tennis Borussia Berlin.

Honours 
VfL Wolfsburg
 DFB-Pokal: Runner-up 1994–95

References

External links 
 
 
 Jacek Frąckiewicz at immerunioner.de 

1969 births
Living people
People from Sztum
Polish footballers
Association football forwards
Ekstraklasa players
2. Bundesliga players
Lechia Gdańsk players
Eintracht Braunschweig players
1. FC Union Berlin players
Tennis Borussia Berlin players
Polish expatriate footballers
Expatriate footballers in Germany
Sportspeople from Pomeranian Voivodeship